Tony Dominguez, Jr. is an American professional boxer. He is locally known as Tony "Red" Dominguez because of his bright red hair. He was undefeated but unfortunately forced into early retirement due to a severely injured rotator cuff.

Early life
Tony Dominguez was born to Antonio Dominguez, Sr, and Mary (Garcia) Dominguez. He was raised in a broken home resulting in his defiance and early trouble with the law. The combination of his troublesome domestic life and hostile public life fueled an anger within him which he contributed to his early violence. After countless fights with his peers, Tony discovered his talent for fighting which resulted in his diversion to boxing.

Boxing career
As an amateur Tony Dominguez fought and won 21 bouts. Of the 21 wins, 19 were first-round knockouts. As a professional he fought 16 fights in which he won all of them. Of the 16 wins, 14 were wins by way of knockout. He quickly became a local favorite to the Stockton area alongside other local boxer, Kenny Lopez.

Personal life
Tony is married to his second wife Kristy (Holifield) Dominguez. He is a father of eight children.

References

1963 births
Living people
American male boxers
Middleweight boxers